Fort Gillem was a United States Army Post located in Forest Park, Georgia, on the southeast edge of Atlanta in Clayton County. Founded in 1941, it was a satellite installation of nearby Fort McPherson. The base housed different supply and support units, including the U.S. Army Criminal Investigation Laboratory and the 3rd MP Group (CID), both units of the United States Army Criminal Investigation Command. It employed 456 active duty personnel, 1,663 Army reservist, and 1,667 civilians. In 1973, its  were annexed by Forest Park. The fort was named in the memory of Lieutenant General Alvan Cullom Gillem, Jr.

History
The US Army established Fort Gillem in 1940 with the simultaneous construction of the Atlanta Quartermaster Depot and the
Atlanta Ordnance Depot, which were mostly completed by December 1942. The two installations operated separately until April 1, 1948, when consolidated physically and operationally as the 'Atlanta Army Depot', a subcommand of the Army Materiel Command. The Atlanta Army Depot was deactivated on June 28, 1974.

Environmental contamination
Buried landfills have contaminated ground water under neighborhoods north and south of Gillem, and inspectors sampled indoor air early summer 2014 for vapor intrusion. , 40 homes had been tested and 26 homes were found to have elevated levels of benzene and trichlorethylene. The chemicals, which entered the homes through groundwater, are those commonly used to strip metal" per the Georgia Environmental Protection Division. The Army plans to install air ventilation systems in these homes to "eliminate or greatly reduce any risk". If higher levels are found in any other homes, larger mitigation efforts will be undertaken during which residents would relocate.

Base closure and redevelopment
On May 13, 2005, the Base Realignment and Closure commission recommended that Fort Gillem, along with Fort McPherson and the Navy Supply Corps School be closed. An exit ceremony was held at Fort Gillem on June 3, 2011, and First Army troops stationed there were transferred to the Rock Island Arsenal in Rock Island, Illinois.

In 2012, after five years of negotiations with the Army, the City of Forest Park purchased 1,170 acres comprising most of the former Fort Gillem for $30 million, and ownership was transferred to the Forest Park/Fort Gillem Implementation Local Redevelopment Authority (ILRA). City officials wanted mixed-use development on the property, but following the housing crash turned their focus to industrial, manufacturing, warehouse and business park development. The only private residences are a 125-unit development owned by The Park, which has a lease with the Army until 2025. There are around 165 acres of contaminated groundwater on the site the cleanup of which the Army is responsible for. The clean up of the land was expected to take ten years.

The Criminal Investigations Division Crime Lab, a forensic crime laboratory, remains open on a 250-acre enclave retained by the Army.

It was decided to list Fort Gillem on the National Priorities List (NPL) of superfunds.
On June 3, the Director of Georgia Department of Natural Resources Environmental Protection Division, 2013, Judson Turner,  requested from USEPA Region IV that the decision be postponed.

On May 2, 2014 officials from the city and the Department of Defense under exclusion of the public held a ceremony at Fort Gillem to commemorate the impending move. The city is partnering with developer Weeks Robinson Properties and hopes it will be booming again, when land re-enters the city and county’s tax digest and "companies such as Porsche North America [are] moving their headquarters to the Forest Park and Hapeville area".

See also
 Morris Army Airfield

Notes

External links
Fort Gillem official website
Forrest Park/Fort Gillem redevelopment program (forestparkga.org)
Fort Gillem at GlobalSecurity.org

Buildings and structures in Clayton County, Georgia
Closed installations of the United States Army
Gillem
Gillem